Take It or Leave It is a 2018 Estonian drama film directed by Liina Triškina-Vanhatalo. It was selected as the Estonian entry for the Best Foreign Language Film at the 91st Academy Awards, but it was not nominated.

Plot
Erik, a 30-year-old construction worker, receives a surprise visit from his ex-girlfriend. Unready to be a mother to their newborn daughter, she asks him to take full custody or she will put the child up for adoption.

Cast
Reimo Sagor - Erik
Liis Lass - Moonika
Epp Eespäev - Evi (Erik's Mother)
Egon Nuter - Mati (Erik's Father)
Viire Valdma - Imbi (Moonika's Mother)
Nora Altrov - Mai (baby)
Emily Viikman- Mai (age 3)
Adeele Sepp - Katrin
Andres Mähar - Sven
Eva Koldits - Liisu
Indrek Ojari - Toomas
Kristjan Lüüs - Marko
Steffi Pähn - Evelin
Jane Napp - Mia
Albert Tiigirand - Otto
Marin Mägi-Efert - Jaana
Edi Edgar Talimaa - Kaspar
Mait Malmsten - Boss
Priit Võigemast - Lawyer
Hilje Murel - Pediatrician
Helena Merzin - Social Worker
Marika Vaarik - Judge
Terje Pennie - Midwife

See also
 List of submissions to the 91st Academy Awards for Best Foreign Language Film
 List of Estonian submissions for the Academy Award for Best Foreign Language Film

References

External links
 

2018 films
2018 drama films
Estonian drama films
Estonian-language films